Appaji is a 1996 Indian Kannada-language action drama film starring Vishnuvardhan and Aamani. The film was directed by D. Rajendra Babu, written by V. Vijayendra Prasad and produced under Surya International banner. The music was scored by M. M. Keeravani.

Cast 
Vishnuvardhan as Appaji and Shakthi (dual role)
Aamani as Lakshmi Desai 
Pankaj Dheer as Arjun 
Sharanya as Rekha 
Sihi Kahi Chandru as Boda
Doddanna as Home Minister
Keerthi as Ranadheer Desai 
Krishne Gowda as Shankar Rao
Lakshman as Captain
M. S. Karanth as IAS officer

Music 

All the songs are composed and scored by M. M. Keeravani. The song "Yaava Deva" was reused from Keeravani's own Telugu song "Sirichandanapu" from Muddula Priyudu.

Release 
The movie was released on 4 January 1996.

References

1996 films
1990s Kannada-language films
Indian action drama films
Films scored by M. M. Keeravani
1990s action drama films
1990s masala films
Films directed by D. Rajendra Babu
1996 drama films